Kilinia is a village in the Paphos District of Cyprus, located 2 km east of Statos. 
Kilinia is inhabited by farmers and the main source of income is agriculture. Most of the inhabitants are more than 50 years old.

References

Communities in Paphos District